Daniel Mesguich (born 15 July 1952) is a French actor and director in theater and opera, and professor of stage acting school.

Biography
In 1970, he was admitted into the Conservatoire National Supérieur d'Art Dramatique, after which he opened the Théâtre du Miroir ("Mirror Theater"), with whom he opened a course in drama. After ten years, he returned to the school to teach at the request of Jean-Pierre Miquel, becoming the youngest professor on campus. He is currently the director of the school.

He has acted in over a hundred plays, fifty operas in France and abroad, and some 40 movies and television pieces.

The actor William Mesguich is his son.

Actor 
 1978: Molière by Ariane Mnouchkine
 1978: Le Dossier 51 by Michel Deville
 1979: Love on the Run by François Truffaut
 1981: Quartet by James Ivory
 1983: La Belle captive by Alain Robbe-Grillet
 1990: L'Autrichienne by Pierre Granier-Deferre (as Fouquier-Tinville)
 1994: Jefferson in Paris by James Ivory
 1996: Limited Edition by Bernard Rapp
 2001: The Musketeer by Peter Hyams (as King Louis XIII)
 2003: Le Divorce by James Ivory

References

External links

 Théâtre On Line

1952 births
Living people
French male film actors
People from Algiers
French people of Algerian descent
French National Academy of Dramatic Arts alumni
Cours Florent alumni
Audiobook narrators